Uiseong County (Uiseong-gun) is a county in Gyeongsangbuk-do Province, South Korea.  Located near the center of the province, it is bounded by Andong on the north, Cheongsong on the east, Gunwi County on the south, and Sangju and Yecheon on the west.  As in most parts of Korea, most of the land is vacant and forested; only about 19% of the county's area is farmland.  The county is largely rural, with an economy dominated by agriculture; the only urbanized area is the county seat, Uiseong-eup.

South Korean national treasure 77, a five-storied stone pagoda, lies in Geumseong-myeon.  Also in Geumseong-myeon are a set of more than 300 dinosaur tracks from the early Cretaceous period.

Uiseong is home to Gounsa, one of the 24 head temples of the Jogye Order of Korean Buddhism.  This temple is located in Danchon-myeon.

Famous people from Uiseong include Yu Seong-ryong, prime minister and one of the best loyal contributors during the Japanese invasions of Korea (1592–98), and the "Garlic Girls", women's curling silver medalists at the 2018 Winter Olympics.

Administrative divisions

Uiseong County is divided into 18 primary districts (1 eup and 17 myeon).  These in turn are divided into 178 legal ri, which in turn are composed of a total of 399 administrative ri.  The county's primary divisions are as follows:

Climate
Uiseong has a monsoon-influenced humid continental climate (Köppen: Dwa) with cold, dry winters and hot, rainy summers.

Festival 
Uiseong Sansuyu Festival

Hwajeon-ri, a 15-minute walk from Uiseong Town, is a spectacular place with Sansuyu. Starting from late March, yellow flowers will bloom and bloom until mid-April, and in October, red fruit will be produced and dyed red. The Hwajeon-ri area consists of more than 30,000 trees that have grown up since the Chosun Dynasty.

Twin towns – sister cities
Uiseong is twinned with:

  Yeonggwang, South Korea
  Uiryeong, South Korea
  Xianyang, China
  Mandal, Mongolia

See also
 Geography of South Korea
 Subdivisions of South Korea

References

External links

County government website (in English)
County government website (in Korean)

 
Counties of North Gyeongsang Province